Miroslav Mikolášik (born 11 September 1952 in Dolný Kubín) is a Slovak politician and Member of the European Parliament (MEP) with the Christian Democratic Movement (KDH), part of the European People's Party and sits on the European Parliament's Committee on Regional Development.

Mikolášik is a substitute for the Committee on the Environment, Public Health and Food Safety, a member of the delegation to the Euro-Mediterranean Parliamentary Assembly and a substitute for the delegation for relations with Israel. In addition to his committee assignments, he is also a supporter of the MEP Heart Group, a group of parliamentarians who have an interest in promoting measures that will help reduce the burden of cardiovascular diseases (CVD).

He still lives in Dolný Kubín along with his wife. He has four children; three sons and one daughter.

Education
 1972–1978: Charles' University (Prague), Medical Faculty
 1982: Certificate of postgraduate study in anaesthesiology and reanimation
 1984: Certificate of postgraduate study in general medicine

Career
 since 1978: Doctor at an anaesthesiological and resuscitation department
 since 1994: General practitioner
 1991–1992: External teacher at the Institute of Medical Ethics and Bioethics (Bratislava)
 1990–1991: Vice-Chairman of a District National Committee (Dolný Kubín)
 1991–1992: Head of the Department for International Relations at the Ministry of Health of the Slovak Republic
 1992–1994: Chairman of KDH (Christian Democratic Movement) (Orava region)
 1994–1998: Member of the National Council of the Slovak Republic for KDH
 1998–1999: Member of the National Council of the Slovak Republic for SDK (Slovak Democratic Coalition) /KDH
 1994–1998: Member of the Committee on Social Affairs and Health Care
 1995–1998: Member of the EU-Slovak Republic Joint Parliamentary Committee
 1998–1999: Member of the Foreign Affairs Committee of the National Council of the Slovak Republic
 1999–2002: Ambassador Extraordinary and Plenipotentiary of the Slovak Republic to Canada
 President of the citizens' association 'Donum Vitae'

See also
 2004 European Parliament election in Slovakia

References

External links
 
 
 

1952 births
Living people
People from Dolný Kubín
Ambassadors of Slovakia to Canada
Christian Democratic Movement MEPs
MEPs for Slovakia 2004–2009
MEPs for Slovakia 2009–2014
MEPs for Slovakia 2014–2019
Members of the National Council (Slovakia) 1994-1998
Members of the National Council (Slovakia) 1998-2002